Shady Point, sometimes referred to as Shadypoint, is a town in Le Flore County, Oklahoma, United States. It is part of the Fort Smith, Arkansas-Oklahoma Metropolitan Statistical Area. The population was 1,026 at the 2010 census, a 21.0 percent increase over the figure of 848 recorded in 2000.

History
A post office was established at Harrison, Indian Territory on September 17, 1891.  It was named for William H. Harrison, an attorney and Choctaw leader.  On December 11, 1894 its name was changed to Shady Point, Indian Territory.  At the time of its founding the community was located in Sugar Loaf County, a part of the Moshulatubbee District of the Choctaw Nation.

In 1894, the settlement moved eastward to the proposed route of the Kansas City, Pittsburg and Gulf Railroad, which built a track through Indian Territory in 1895–96. In 1900, the Kansas City Southern Railway bought out the Kansas City, Pittsburg and Gulf Railroad. The population was estimated at 200 In 1901. In the same year, the Poteau Valley Railroad built tracks from Shady Point to the mines at Sutter (which was renamed Calhoun in 1914), bringing prosperity to Shady Point as a coal shipping point.  

Agriculture became the basis for Shady Point's economy during the Great Depression. The Evans Coal Company closed its deep-shaft coal mine in 1980, the same year the town incorporated. The population then was 235. Applied Energy Services built a power plant in 1991 that burned half of the coal produced in Oklahoma by the end of the twentieth century.

Geography
Shady Point is located at  (35.128571, -94.659726).

Demographics

As of the census of 2000, there were 848 people, 306 households, and 241 families residing in the town. The racial makeup of the town was 86.56% White, 8.96% Native American, 0.35% Asian, 0.47% from other races, and 3.66% from two or more races. Hispanic or Latino of any race were 2.59% of the population.

There were 306 households, out of which 35.9% had children under the age of 18 living with them, 66.0% were married couples living together, 9.5% had a female householder with no husband present, and 21.2% were non-families. 20.6% of all households were made up of individuals, and 10.1% had someone living alone who was 65 years of age or older. The average household size was 2.77 and the average family size was 3.19.

In the town, the population was spread out, with 29.6% under the age of 18, 10.3% from 18 to 24, 25.5% from 25 to 44, 22.2% from 45 to 64, and 12.5% who were 65 years of age or older. The median age was 33 years. For every 100 females, there were 86.4 males. For every 100 females age 18 and over, there were 91.3 males.

The median income for a household in the town was $24,453, and the median income for a family was $31,250. Males had a median income of $23,906 versus $18,036 for females. The per capita income for the town was $13,091. About 19.7% of families and 23.8% of the population were below the poverty line, including 30.2% of those under age 18 and 22.4% of those age 65 or over.

NRHP sites

Several sites in and around Shady Point are on the National Register of Historic Places listings in Le Flore County, Oklahoma, including the Dog Creek School, the Shady Point School, and Trahern's Station.

References

Towns in LeFlore County, Oklahoma
Towns in Oklahoma
Fort Smith metropolitan area
Populated places established in 1891